Arthur Alexis Birney (May 28, 1852 – September 4, 1916) was an American lawyer who served as United States Attorney for the District of Columbia from 1893 to 1897.

Birney was born in Paris to a prominent political family. His grandfather James G. Birney was a Southern abolitionist leader and twice a candidate for President of the United States. His father William Birney and his uncle David B. Birney were both Union generals in the Civil War, and another uncle, James M. Birney, was Lieutenant Governor of Michigan.

Birney graduated from the University of Michigan Law School and moved to Washington, D.C., in 1873, where he soon became an Assistant United States Attorney. He later became the U.S. Attorney in 1893 and helped prosecute the Sugar Trust Case. After leaving the U.S. Attorney's office in 1897, he aided in the prosecution of Senator William A. Clark of Montana under the direction of the Senate Committee on Privileges and Elections, which resulted in the senator's resignation. Birney died of heart failure on September 4, 1916, while playing golf at the Washington Country Club in Virginia.

References

United States Attorneys for the District of Columbia
19th-century American lawyers
Assistant United States Attorneys
University of Michigan Law School alumni
1852 births
1916 deaths
Lawyers from Washington, D.C.